Mount Sir Allan MacNab is a mountain located in the Premier Range of British Columbia, Canada. The range is named for Sir Allan MacNab, a Canadian industrialist who was premier of the Province of Canada from 1854 to 1856.

References 

Two-thousanders of British Columbia
Cariboo Mountains
Kamloops Division Yale Land District